Tamil Thai Valthu is the state anthem of Tamil Nadu. The song was written by Manonmaniam Sundaram Pillai, and composed by M. S. Viswanathan. Ever since the Tamil Nadu government under M. Karunanidhi issued an order on 23 November 1970, the official functions of the Government of Tamil Nadu, and those functions organised by educational institutions and public establishments, have started with this song, and ended with the Indian National Anthem. The song is sung daily in schools all over Tamil Nadu during the assembly in the morning.

On 17 December, 2021, the Tamil Nadu government under chief minister M.K.Stalin, formally declared the song as the official state song, stating that it would be sung at all public events in educational institutes and government offices. Except for disabled people, everybody will have to stand when it is played or being sung.

Lyrics

Current official version

Original version

See also 
 Flag of Tamil Nadu
 Tamil Thai
 Tamil Thai Valthu (Puducherry)
 Jana Gana Mana
 Vande Mataram
 List of Indian state songs

References

Notes

External links
Tamil Thai Valthu

Indian state songs
Government of Tamil Nadu